Salvador Cristau Coll (born 15 April 1950) is a Spanish prelate of the Catholic Church who has been auxiliary bishop of the  Diocese of Terrassa since 2010.

Early life and education
Salvador Cristau Coll was born on 15 April 1950 in Barcelona, Spain. He studied at the Universidad Autónoma de Barcelona and received a Bachelor of Civil Law degree in 1972. Cristau entered the Upper Seminary of Toledo and graduated from the Theological Faculty of Northern Spain with a Bachelor of Theology degree.

Parish assignments
On October 12, 1980, Cristau was ordained a priest in the Catedral Primada Santa María de Toledo by Cardinal Marcelo González Martín for the Archdiocese of Toledo. From 1980 to 1981, he was the parochial vicar at the Good Shepherd Parish and from 1981 to 1984 at Saint Justus Parish. From 1984 to 1985 Cristau was the Parochial Administrator of the Saint Leocadia Parish.

On 14 January 1985, Cristau was incardinated as a priest of the Archdiocese of Barcelona and served as a parochial vicar to several churches.

Diocesan assignments
Between 1980 and 1985, Cristau served as the Judicial Vicar of the Toledo's diocesan Ecclesiastical Tribunal.

Within the Barcelona archdiocese, Cristau has held several positions to include the Diocesan Curia, Archpriest of the Cathedral and Secretary Chancellor of the Curia.

In 2004, after the erection of the Terrassa diocese, Cristau was incardinated there and was appointed as the diocesan vicar general.

Episcopal career
On 18 May 2010, Pope Benedict appointed him titular bishop of Algeciras and auxiliary bishop of Terrassa. Cristau was ordained in Terrassa's cathedral on 26 June 2010 by Josep Àngel Saiz Meneses, Bishop of Terrassa. The co-consecrators were Archbishop Renzo Fratini, Apostolic Nuncio to Spain, and Lluís Martínez Sistach, Archbishop of Barcelona.

References

External links 
 Roman Catholic Diocese of Terrassa 
 

Living people
1950 births
Spanish Roman Catholic titular bishops
21st-century Roman Catholic bishops in Spain
People from Barcelona